John J. Graff (November 1866 - April 2, 1932) was a pitcher in Major League Baseball. He played for the Washington Senators in 1893.

References

External links

1866 births
1932 deaths
Major League Baseball pitchers
Washington Senators (1891–1899) players
Shamokin Maroons players
Allentown Peanut Eaters players
Albany Governors players
Baseball players from Washington, D.C.
19th-century baseball players